Filip Antovski (born 24 November 2000) is a Macedonian footballer who plays as a left back for Croatian club Istra 1961 on loan from the Austrian club Austria Wien, as well as for the North Macedonia U21 national team.

Club career
Antovski started his professional career at the age of 17 by making his First Macedonian Football League debut for Vardar in April 2018. He played the full 90 minutes on his debut and also picked up an assist. In February 2019 he made his first professional transfer abroad, by signing for Croatian side Dinamo Zagreb where he was set to play for their second team, performing in Croatian Second Football League. After 18 months performing for Dinamo II, Filip got sent out on a loan to Bulgarian side Slavia Sofia to play in the Bulgarian top division. On 18 October 2020 he also made his league debut for Slavia, in the 1–0 win against Levski Sofia.

On 2 July 2021 he moved to Austria Wien in Austria.

International career
Antovski made his international debut for North Macedonia U21 on 22 March 2019 in the friendly match against Ukraine where he found himself in the starting lineup and played for 73 minutes. The match was played on a neutral field in Turkey and it ended in a 3–1 loss for Macedonia. Previously he also had numerous appearances for the U19, U18 and U17 national teams as well.

References

External links
 
 

2000 births
Sportspeople from Kumanovo
Living people
Macedonian footballers
North Macedonia youth international footballers
North Macedonia under-21 international footballers
Association football forwards
FK Vardar players
GNK Dinamo Zagreb II players
PFC Slavia Sofia players
FK Austria Wien players
NK Istra 1961 players
Macedonian First Football League players
First Football League (Croatia) players
First Professional Football League (Bulgaria) players
2. Liga (Austria) players
Croatian Football League players
Macedonian expatriate footballers
Expatriate footballers in Croatia
Macedonian expatriate sportspeople in Croatia
Expatriate footballers in Bulgaria
Macedonian expatriate sportspeople in Bulgaria
Expatriate footballers in Austria
Macedonian expatriate sportspeople in Austria